Ratlam State was a 13 gun salute (15 local) princely state in India, part of the Malwa Agency of Central India during the British Raj.

The state's capital was Ratlam town in modern Ratlam district of Madhya Pradesh. Ratlam State was originally a prosperous kingdom, its parganas included Dharad (Ratlam), Raoti, Dhamnod, Badnawar, Dagparawa, Alot, Titrod, Kotri, Gadgucha, Agar, Nahargarh, Kanar, Bhilara and Ramgharia yielding a revenue of Rs.53,00,000 in the 17th century. Maharaja Ratan Singh Rathore of Ratlam supported Dara Shukoh during the Mughal succession war. However Dara Shukoh lost and Ratan Singh was killed in battle. The new emperor Aurangzeb annexed Ratlam and reduced the state to a great extent. The state further lost land to the Scindias of Gwalior. During British rule in 1901 the state had an area of 1795 km2 and an estimated revenue of Rs.8,00,000.

History

Early history
The rulers of Ratlam were originally   princes and Jagirdars (nobles) of Marwar. Dalpat Singh, who was the 4th son of Raja Udai Singh of Marwar was given the jagirs of Balaheda, Pisangan and Kherwa. Dalpat Singhs son Maheshdas Rathore was given the jagir of Jalore by the Mughal emperor Shah Jahan for his successful campaign against the Pashtun tribes of Afghanistan. Maheshdas Rathore's son Ratan Singh continued his father's legacy as a Mughal general in Afghanistan. He repelled Central Asian marauders and campaigned against the Persian Safavids with the Mughal prince Dara Shukoh.

Shah Jahan made Ratan Singh the Maharaja of Dharad for his bravery shown against the Persians at Khorasan and the Uzbeks at Kandahar. Ratan Singh had also shown his bravery by killing the emperors favourite elephant. The imperial elephant had trampled several civilians in Agra and none could stop its rampage, but Ratan Singh quickly climbed the elephant and killed it by stabbing its neck with a katar. Shah Jahan was so impressed by the heroics shown by Ratan Singh, that he gave him the parganas of Dharad, Raoti, Dhamnod, Badnawar, Dagparawa, Alot, Titrod, Kotri, Gadgucha, Agar, Nahargarh, Kanar, Bhilara and Ramgharia. Maharaja Ratan Singh thus founded the kingdom of Dharad in 1652 (predecessor to the State of Ratlam). Ratan singh was given the titles of Maharajadhiraj, shree Huzur and Maharaja Bahadur by Shah Jahan. He was further decorated with the insignias of chaur (yak's tail), morchal (peacock plumes), suraj mukhi (fans with a representation of the sun and moon) and mahi-maratib (insignia of the fish). Ratan Singh was killed in battle while fighting the Traitor son of Shah Jahan, Aurangzeb in Dharmatpur, his wife Maharani Sukhroopde Kanwar Shekhawat Ji Sahiba committed sati in 1658.

Division of Ratlam
After Ratan Singhs death, Aurangzeb degraded Ratlam to a zamindari but his descendants were allowed to rule the area. In 1695 Aurangzeb annexed Ratlam due to "imperial displeasure". Keshodas who was the second grandson of Ratan Singh had his men kill the Jaziya collectors due to which all land holdings of Ratlam were confiscated by the Mughals and transferred to Muhammad Azam Shah. Keshodas was punished and degraded in rank. The Rathore dynasty of Ratlam suffered during this time period and their fortune declined rapidly. However Keshodas joined Mughal service and was able to recover some of his holdings through which he became the raja of Sitamau State, Ratlam itself remained under Mughal control. Another son of Ratan Singh called Chattrasal was also active as a Mughal general and was able to lead a successful career, however during a siege his eldest son Hathe Singh was killed by the shot of European artillery. The Mughal emperor restored Ratlam to Chattrasal in 1705 for his sons sacrifice. Chattrasal soon died and divided his state into three parts which was held by his two sons and one grandson, each successor was given equal ranks and Privileges. This division caused a lot of infighting, Chattrasals second son Keshri Singh took Ratlam and displaced his nephew Berisal (son of first son Hathe Singh), in turn the third son Pratap Singh killed Keshri Singh and took over all three divisions. During this time Keshri Singhs elder son Man Singh was at Delhi while his younger son Jai Singh was at Ratlam. Jai Singh successfully escaped and started preparing an army, he rallied his relatives from Narwar and Lalgarh and soon prepared an army to attack Ratlam. Pratap Singh was defeated by Jai Singh at Sagod and was killed in the action that followed. Jai Singh soon entered Ratlam and captured it, his brother Man Singh was at Amber during this time and tried to get help from its ruler but it was not needed any longer. Jai Singh met his brother and they both returned to Ratlam. Man Singh succeeded as the next ruler of Ratlam while Jai Singh took over Pratap Singhs lands and became the first ruler of Sailana State.

British Era
During Parbat Singhs reign Ratlam was harassed by the Gwalior state, but on 5 January 1819 it became a British protectorate, following which an arrangement was made by which the Sindhia engaged never to send any troops into the country or to interfere with the internal administration in return for a yearly tribute. The tribute treaty did not last for long as Daulat Rao Scindia soon relinquished his rights of tribute on Ratlam and Sailana, the tribute was thus paid directly to the British instead. 

During British rule, the State had an area of 1795 km2, which was closely interlaced with the territory of the princely State of Sailana. In 1901, the state had a population of 83,773; the town of Ratlam had a population of 36,321. The state enjoyed an estimated revenue of rs.8,00,000. The town was a junction on the Rajputana-Malwa Railway, and was an important trade centre, especially of opium.

The state's last ruler signed the instrument of accession to the Indian Union on 15 June 1948.

Rulers
The rulers were Ratanawat Rathore Rajputs and were closely related to the ruling families of Sailana, Sitamau, Kachhi Baroda and Multhan.

Maharajas

Rajas

Maharajas

See also
List of Rajput dynasties and states
Malwa Agency

References

External links

 Ratlam Search Engine

Ratlam district
Princely states of Madhya Pradesh
States and territories disestablished in 1948
1652 establishments in India
Rathores
1948 disestablishments in India
Rajputs